Tete António is an Angolan politician who has been the Minister of External Relations since 2020.

References 

Living people
Foreign ministers of Angola
21st-century Angolan people
Year of birth missing (living people)
Place of birth missing (living people)